Ivan Miller (born 4 September 1949) is a New Zealand former professional motocross rider. He competed in motocross events from 1964 until 1983.

Motocross racing career
Miller was born in Blenheim, New Zealand. He began competing in motocross in 1964 at the age of 15. He won his first New Zealand championship titles during the 1967/68 season in the 250cc and 350cc classes. Miller moved to Australia to race and then to England in 1969. While riding in England he received support from Comerfords to ride Bultacos and later KTMs. In 1971 he won two Australian championships in the 500cc and unlimited classes. He finished third in the British 250cc championship in 1974. The following year he was a member of the British teams that competed in the Motocross des Nations and the Trophée des Nations. In the late 1970s and early 1980s Miller continued to achieve success in the UK, Australia and New Zealand.  He was the 1976/77 New Zealand A grade champion, and he won the open class in 1977/78, 1979/80 and 1980/81 riding Suzukis. He also competed in the Trans-AMA series in the United States and Canada and he rode for the Rayleigh Rockets speedway team in 1972.

References

1949 births
Living people
Sportspeople from Blenheim, New Zealand
New Zealand motocross riders
New Zealand speedway riders
Rayleigh Rockets riders